The 1988 Canoe Slalom World Cup was a series of races in four canoeing and kayaking categories organized by the International Canoe Federation (ICF). It was the inaugural edition. The final race was held in Augsburg, Germany, on 21 August 1988.

Final standings

References

External links 
 International Canoe Federation

Canoe Slalom World Cup
1988 in canoeing